Towers High School (THS) is a high school in unincorporated DeKalb County, Georgia, United States. It is a part of the DeKalb County School System. It is physically within the Belvedere Park census-designated place, but has a Decatur postal address.

The school was built in 1963-1964 and currently includes 9th through 12th grades. In 1963, initially attending double sessions at Avondale High School, grades 8-10 moved into the school during the fall. The cafeteria and gymnasium were still to be completed. THS subsequently added a junior and senior class during the next two years. At that time period there were no middle schools, elementary was 1-7 and traditional high schools were 8–12. The first class graduated in 1966 and the first class to complete all five years at the school graduated on June 3, 1968.

School activities
The school offers activities including Air Force Junior Reserve Officers' Training Corps (AFJROTC GA-955) National Champions 2001 Armed Regulation Drill, At Club, Beta Club, Career Discovery (Mentoring), Drama Club, Family, Career, and Community Leaders of America (FCCLA), Forensics Club, Future Business Leaders of America (FBLA), Japanese/Anime Club, Literary Magazine, Mu Alpha Theta (Math Club), and National Honor Society.

Athletics 
The school's sports teams are named the Titans.

Towers High School recently re-formed a tennis and volleyball team.

The football team currently plays at Avondale Stadium.

Notable alumni 
 Rodriquez Jacquees Broadnax, American R&B singer and songwriter
 Jan Hooks, Saturday Night Live actor, attended, did not graduate
 Michael W. Jackson, Alabama District Attorney 
 Ricky Jones, professional baseball player
 Richard Jewell, security guard credited with heroism during the Centennial Olympic Park bombing, later received international attention when he was falsely accused of perpetrating the bombing himself
 Da'Norris Searcy, professional football player
 Julius Williams, professional football player
 Devonte Wyatt, professional football player

References

External links
 Towers High School

DeKalb County School District high schools
1963 establishments in Georgia (U.S. state)
Educational institutions established in 1963